Qasrok, is a village located in the Al-Malikiyah District of Hasakah Governorate in northeastern Syria. The village is surrounded by a number of ancient churches which date back to early Christian times. The village is inhabited by Assyrians belonging to the Syriac Orthodox Church.

References 
كنيسة القديس مار شمعون الزيتوني للسريان الأرثوذكس, a-Olaf

Populated places in al-Malikiyah District
Assyrian communities in Syria